Rameez Alam (born 7 December 1988) is a Pakistani first-class cricketer who plays for Multan cricket team.

References

External links
 

1988 births
Living people
Pakistani cricketers
Multan cricketers
Cricketers from Sahiwal
Balochistan cricketers
State Bank of Pakistan cricketers
South Asian Games bronze medalists for Pakistan
South Asian Games medalists in cricket